General Steamship Company was founded in 1920 in Houston, Texas, as a Private Company, and now goes by Gensteam since 1996. General Steamship Company has a fleet of cargo ships that operate worldwide. Gensteam has a Gensteam Operations Desk website that tracks all shipping logistics. Gensteam headquarters is now in San Francisco, California. General Steamship Company was part owner of American Pacific Steamship Company in New York state and Los Angeles during and post World War II. American Pacific Steamship Company was founded in 1942 in New York City, and was previously called Los Angeles Tanker Operators Inc. which operated T2 tanker ships.  During World War II the General Steamship Company and American Pacific Steamship Company were active with charter shipping with the Maritime Commission and War Shipping Administration.

Divisions:
General Steamship Agencies is Gensteam United States operation.
Wheelhouse Shipping Agency is Gensteam Canada operation. Wheelhouse Shipping Agency was formed from the merger of Canadian Empire Shipping and Compass Marine in 2017.
Alaska Maritime Agencies   is Gensteam Alaska operation. Formed in 1960 as a joint venture between Kerr Steamship Company and General Steamship.

Offices

Houston, Texas
San Francisco, California - San Francisco Bay ports
Los Angeles (Port of Los Angeles, Port of Long Beach, Port Hueneme, Port of San Diego)
New Orleans, Louisiana
Baton Rouge, Louisiana
Corpus Christi, Texas and other Texas ports
Mobile, Alabama 
Stockton, California (Port of Stockton, Port of Sacramento)
Columbia River ports
Seattle
Anchorage, Alaska
Wheelhouse Shipping Agency Ltd, Western Canada

Gensteams is a ship agency service, ships dry dockings, military, offshore, and handles distressed vessels.

History
General Steamship Company was founded by Captain John Barneson, Harry S. Scott, Captain Harry Birkholm, Clarence Belknap and others. Harry H. Scott became the President till 1953. In the 1920s they opened routes to the US West Coast, Far East, South Pacific Ocean, Europe, and Central America and South America. The company survived the [[Great Depression]. Durning World War II General Steamship Company operated ships for the U.S. Government, British Ministry of War Transport, the Norwegian Shipping and Trade Mission, and Canadian military  For U.S. Government General Steamship Company operated  51 T-2 type tanker vessels and a total of 175 ships.

Los Angeles Tanker Operators, Inc.
Los Angeles Tanker Operators, Inc. was founded in Los Angeles, California  on July 8, 1943 by Harry H. Birkholm, Morgan Adams, A. P. Scott, Eugene Overton, W. Bruce Bryant, Leander K. Vermille, and Edward D. Lyman. Birkholm was president. W. Bruce Bryant became the district manager for General Steamship Company in 1942. Los Angeles Tanker Operators, Inc. operated a fleet of T2 tankers, type T2-SE-A2.

Los Angeles Tanker Operators' fleet of ships were used to help the World War II effort. During World War II Los Angeles Tanker Operators Merchant navy ships for the United States Shipping Board. During World War II Los Angeles Tanker Operators was active with charter shipping with the Maritime Commission and War Shipping Administration. OLos Angeles Tanker Operators operated Liberty ships tankers for the merchant navy. The ship was run by its Los Angeles Tanker Operatorsy crew and the US Navy supplied United States Navy Armed Guards to man the deck guns and radio.

Some tanker ships operated for World War II:
Charlotte P. Gilman, 
Henry C. Wallace 
Alan Seeger 
John Goode

General Steamship Company ships

General Steamship Company ships owned or charted ships:
SS Hobart Baker
Tiger Hill
USS Procyon (AF-61)
USS Gwinnett (AVS-5)
USNS Twin Falls (T-AGM-11)
SS Enid Victory
SS Bates Victory
SS Lawton B. Evans
SS Niagara Victory
 SS Waltham Victory
SS Wooster Victory
SS William G. Fargo
SS Nampa Victory
 SS Phillips Victory
 SS Edward E. Hale
SS Edward J. O'Brien
SS John Evans
SS John W. Searles
SS Middlebury Victory
SS Telfair Stockton
USS Majaba (AG-43)
SS Morgan Robertson
 SS Illawarra
SS Thorl 
SD Thorsgaard 
SS Thorsisle
SS Enid Victory 
SS Illawarra

American Pacific Steamship Company
American Pacific Steamship Company was founded in July 1943 as Los Angeles Tanker Operators, Inc. to support the World War II effort. On April 22, 1946 Los Angeles Tanker Operators, Inc. changed its name to American Pacific Steamship Company as the line began to operate dry cargo ships also.

American Pacific Steamship Company Ships owned or charted ships:
USNT Shawnee Trail
SS Mission San Miguel
 SS Abraham Rosenberg 
SS Alan Seeger
 SS Alexander V. Fraser 
SS Admiral Arthur P. Fairfield
 SS Idaho
 SS Chadd's Ford  T2
USS Cohocton T2
SS Coquille T2
SS Lookout Mountain T2
USS Mascoma (AO-83)
SS Mello Franco 
 SS Milan R. Stefanik 
SS John Goode
SS Samuel L. Cobb
SS King S. Woolsey
SS William Glackens 
SS Henry Villard
 SS Howard T. Ricketts
SS William W. Seaton
SS Chung Tung
SS Donald S. Wright

Los Angeles Tanker Operators Inc ships
Ships of the Los Angeles Tanker Operators Inc.:
USNS Mission Loreto
USNS Mission Los Angeles
USNS Mission Santa Clara
USNS Mission San Rafael
USNS Mission San Antonio
SS Hilda Marjanne
SS Joshua Tree
SS Verendrye
SS Charlotte P. Gilman
SS Inglewood Hills
SS Alan Seeger 
SS John Goode
SS Henry C. Wallace

See also

World War II United States Merchant Navy

References 

Shipping companies of the United States
General Steamship Company
Container shipping companies
American companies established in 1920
Transport companies established in 1920
Tanker shipping companies
Supply shipping companies
Port operating companies
Logistics companies of the United States
Logistics industry in the United States
Container shipping companies of the United States